Annie Jessie Fortescue Harrison (30 December 1848 – 12 February 1944), also known as Annie, Lady Hill and Lady Arthur Hill, was an English composer of songs and piano pieces.

She was born in Calcutta, British India, the daughter of James Fortescue Harrison, MP of Kilmarnock. In 1865, they moved to Crawley Down, Sussex, where her father built a mansion called Down Park. In 1877, she married Lord Arthur Hill, who had been a widower. They had one daughter.

Two of her piano instrumentals are:
"The Elfin Waltzes"
"Our Favourite Galop"

Two of her operettas are:
The Ferry Girl
The Lost Husband

Her most popular song was "In the Gloaming" (1877), with lyrics by Meta Orred.

References

External links
A Forty-Sixth Garland of British Light Music Composers

1848 births
1944 deaths
English composers
British women composers
People from Kolkata
People from Crawley Down